Simon, King of the Witches is a 1971 American exploitation horror film directed by Bruce Kessler and starring Andrew Prine, Brenda Scott, George Paulsin, Norman Burton and others. The film centers on the title character as he attempts to become a god through magic rituals.

Plot

Simon Sinestrari (Andrew Prine), a cynical ceremonial magician, is on a quest to become a god. Simon is living in a storm sewer, selling his charms and potions for money, when he is befriended by a young male prostitute named Turk (George Paulsin). Turk introduces Simon to his world of drugs, wild parties, and bizarre Satanic rituals featuring Ultra Violet and a goat. Death, freak-outs and mayhem ensue, along with romance for Simon with the district attorney's daughter Linda (Brenda Scott). Simon, a degenerate practitioner of magic uses his satanic rituals to seduce Linda. Together, the two lovers search for the proper spell to make themselves into gods.

Cast
Andrew Prine as Simon Sinestrari
George Paulsin as Turk
Brenda Scott as Linda
Gerald York as Hercules Van Sint
Norman Burton as Rackum
William Martel as Commissioner Davies
Ray Galvin as Chief Boyle
Art Hern as Mayor
Ultra Violet as Sarah
Harry Rose as Landlord

Production

The misleading advertising campaign, which set up Simon as a demonic sex orgy film cashing in on the Charles Manson trials, seriously hurt the film at the box office. The film is practically bloodless, with only brief nudity (which, again against the norm, actually serves a purpose in the story) but no explicit sex and no parallels whatsoever with Manson. Like many other more eccentric 1970s low budget genre films, Simon has become a cult film over the years, albeit an extremely marginal one.

There was also a paperback novelization of Simon by Baldwin Hills, more than likely a pen name, which took the satirical camp of the film one step further into full-on absurd comedy.

Home media

Simon, King of the Witches was released on special edition DVD by Dark Sky Films in 2008. It was reissued on Blu-Ray DVD in 2017 by Code Red DVD.

Reception
Charles Tatum from eFilmCritic.com awarded the film one out of five stars, writing, “This film tries to be serious, almost like an exposé, but it fails miserably. It is often funny, without meaning to be. Simon, King of the Witches is all smoke and mirrors. I do not recommend it.”  TV Guide gave the film 1/5 stars, criticizing the film's confusing plot.

Ian Jane from DVD Talk wrote, “Simon King of the Witches is a wild mix of seventies psychedelics and occult quirk that makes for a truly quirky watch. Andrew Prine is great in the lead and the film might work better as a cultural artifact than an actual horror picture but regardless, it remains an interesting and well-made movie” 
Jason Coffman from Film Monthly.com gave the film a positive review, writing, “Simon, King of the Witches is an entertaining film and an interesting time capsule of very early 1970s culture... It might not be a lost genre-defining masterpiece, but it is a gem that deserves to be seen.” Debi Moore from Dread Central rated the film a score of 3.5 out of 5, commending Prine's performance, psychedelic tone, innovative effects.

See also
 List of American films of 1971

Sources
 Gods In Polyester: A Survivors' Account Of 70's Cinema Obscura  features a chapter by Bruce Kessler on the making of Simon.

References

External links

 

 Simon, King of the Witches review by George R. Reis at DVD Drive-in

1971 films
1970s exploitation films
1971 horror films
1971 independent films
American exploitation films
American independent films
American supernatural horror films
Films about witchcraft
Films shot in Los Angeles
Films about Satanism
Films scored by Stu Phillips
Films directed by Bruce Kessler
1970s English-language films
1970s American films